Love Me for a Reason – The Collection is the seventh compilation album by Irish boy band Boyzone. It was released on 17 February 2014.

Track listing

Charts

References

2014 albums
Boyzone albums